Jesús Omar Rivera Dávila (born January 16, 1962), better known as El Boricuazo, is a Puerto Rican radio and TV personality, writer, tourist guide, college instructor, and public speaker from Bayamón. Rivera is known for his appearances on Puerto Rican television and radio, where he offers stories, facts, and trivia about Puerto Rico that are not well known to the general public.

Early life
Jesús Omar Rivera Dávila was born in 1962, in San Juan, Puerto Rico to Aníbal Rivera and Blanca Dávila Rodríguez. Rivera has two brothers and a sister: José Aníbal, Néstor, and Blanquita, who were raised together in Bayamón. At a young age, Rivera started collecting information and facts that were curious, interesting, and less known to Puerto Ricans. He created his own tables and statistics. He would later graduate from the University of Puerto Rico, majoring in psychology and tourism.

Career
At the age of 21, Rivera became a tourist guide. Upon turning 23, he became the Academic Director of the Department of Tourism and Air Lines of the Benedict School in San Juan. After this, Rivera directed and coordinated the programs of Tourism and Air Lines in the Campuses of Bayamón and Caguas of Emory College, and the Program of Tourist Guides and Operators of Excursions of the National Center of Touristic Studies in Hato Rey.

Rivera's professional life is concentrated and focused on the offering of talks, training, seminars, courses, and conferences in Puerto Rico, the United States, Hispanic America, and Spain. He has appeared and participated in national TV programs including news and interview or talk shows on stations such as WKAQ-TV, WAPA-TV, WIPR-TV, WLII-TV, and WPRM-FM. He used to have a weekly appearance on Univisión Puerto Rico.

His first book, titled Boricuazo, Tu Orgullo Nacional, was self-published in early 2008 as a collection of facts about the impact that Puerto Rico and its people has had on the world.

See also
List of Puerto Ricans

Notes

References

1962 births
Living people
Puerto Rican educators
People from San Juan, Puerto Rico